Chitra Singh is an Indian ghazal singer. She, alongside her husband, Jagjit Singh, popularized the ghazal genre. Respectfully known as the "king and queen of the Ghazal world," the husband and wife duo created some of the most successful Indian music of the 1970s and '80s.

Personal life
Chitra was born Chitra Shome into a Bengali family. After completing her education, she was married to Debo Prasad Dutta, an executive in a leading advertising agency. The wedding was held in the mid-1950s, and the couple had a daughter, Monica, in 1959.

While still married to Debo Prasad, Chitra met Jagjit Singh, at that time a struggling singer. Jagjit Singh was of Sikh heritage and hailed from Sriganganagar in distant Rajasthan. They first met at a recording studio in 1967, by which time the marriage of the Duttas was already under strain for unknown reasons. Chitra found solace in Jagjit, and says she was much taken by his "caring" personality. In 1968, Chitra left Prasad, taking her 9-year-old daughter with her. In 1969, she divorced her husband, secured custody of Monica, and married Jagjit Singh. The affair, the divorce and the wedding were disapproved of by their families and the couple were to have little contact with their kin thereafter. Chitra and Jagjit became the parents of a son, Vivek. Professionally, the couple formed a ghazal singing duo and the couple achieved great success.

Vivek died in a road accident on July 27, 1990. Chitra has never sung in public, or recorded any song, since the day her son died. Her daughter from her first marriage, Monica, first fell in love with Jehangir Chowdhary, an award-winning cinematographer. They were married in 1988 and became the parents of two sons. In 2005, Monica divorced Chowdhary and married British national Mark Houghton Roger Atkins, the managing director of a firm based in Vikhroli, Mumbai. In 2007, Monica filed a case of harassment against Atkins. In  2008, a magistrate issued a non-bailable warrant against him, but he had already fled the country. In 2009, Monica, aged 50, died by suicide. She was survived by her two sons, Armaan (17) and Umair (12). Two years after this tragedy, Jagjit Singh, died of a brain haemorrhage in 2011. Chitra now lives with her two grandsons.

Discography

 A Milestone (1976)
 The Unforgettables (1978)
 Gold Disc (1979)
 Ae mere dil (1980)
 The earliest recordings of Jagjit and Chitra Singh
 Live in concert with Jagjit Chitra Singh
 Live at Wembley
 Live at Royal Albert Hall
 The Latest
 Desires
 Arth/Saath Saath
 Chirag
 Live in Trinidad
 Main aur Meri Tanhaayee (1981)
 The Latest (1982)
 Ecstasies (1984)
 A Sound Affair (1985)
 Echoes (1985–86, Live Recordings)
 Beyond Time (1987)
  Mirza Ghalib (1988)
 Someone Somewhere (1990)
 H O P E (1991)

References

External links
 Oct 2007 Interview
 

Living people
Indian women ghazal singers
Bengali singers
Indian ghazal singers
21st-century Indian women singers
Women film score composers
21st-century Indian singers
20th-century Indian women singers
20th-century Indian singers
1945 births
Women musicians from West Bengal